WSMZ (850 kHz) is an AM radio station in Muskegon, Michigan.

History
Between 1926 and 1999, this station was the original WKBZ, the oldest radio station in Muskegon. It was founded in Ludington, Michigan, by Karl L. Ashbacker, and broadcast on 1170 kHz until 1927, 1500 kHz until 1941, and 1490 kHz until 1947. The station relocated to Muskegon in 1934, establishing studios in the Continental Hotel. (The Ashbackers later built another station in Ludington, starting up WKLA in 1944.)
The Ashbackers owned WKBZ until December 1951, when Arch Shawd acquired the Ashbacker Radio Company. Shawd sold the station in 1958 to Walter Patterson, who sold his WKBZ Radio Corporation to Frederick Allman and Robert Richards in 1963. Reams Communications Corporation bought WKBZ in 1968 and owned it until 1986, when the station was sold to KBZ Broadcasting.

WKBZ-AM-FM was donated to Grand Valley State University by Robert Jewell and Daniel Thill in 1995; the university elected to sell the stations to WLC Communications, Inc., in early 1997. In November 1998, however, WLC returned WKBZ and WKBZ-FM 95.3 in Whitehall to Grand Valley State, which converted the stations to public radio as WGVS-AM-FM. (The WKBZ call letters moved to 1520 AM, which went silent in 2002, and are now on 1090 AM.)
On August 27, 2009, WGVU and WGVS flipped to the oldies format—a first for a public radio station. The station's playlist encompassed hits from the mid-1950s through the mid-1970s and featured many seldom-heard songs not typically played on commercial oldies stations, including some titles by local Michigan artists. Big band, traditional pop, and easy listening songs from the 1940s through the '70s were featured on Sunday mornings during the Sunday Morning Standards program. Also airing on Sundays was the West Michigan Top 40 show, which counted down the songs on a historic local record chart from a given date.

In late 2021, Grand Valley State University announced that it would end the "Real Oldies" format and shut down WGVU and WGVS on January 7, 2022. The university planned to return the AM stations' licenses to the Federal Communications Commission (FCC) and sell their transmitter sites. WGVU-TV and WGVU-FM were not affected by the shutdown of the AM stations.

Effective June 28, 2022, Grand Valley State sold WGVS to Ed and Jennifer Czelada's Smile FM for $25,000. While current silent, the station is expected to join the contemporary Christian-formatted Smile FM network.

References

External links

FCC History Cards for WSMZ

SMZ (AM)
Radio stations established in 1926
1926 establishments in Michigan